Philip John Payton  is a Cornish-Australian historian and Emeritus Professor of Cornish and Australian Studies at the University of Exeter and formerly Director of the Institute of Cornish Studies based at Tremough, just outside Penryn, Cornwall. An Australian citizen, he is Professor of History at Flinders University in Adelaide, South Australia.

Birth and education
He was born in 1953 in Sussex. His mother was Cornish, from the Helston area.  His father was a merchant seaman, then businessman and academic. Payton spent much of his childhood in Sussex and attended Haywards Heath Grammar School. Active in Mebyon Kernow (the Party for Cornwall) as a teenager, he began his writing career in articles on Cornish history and politics in journals such as New Cornwall and Cornish Nation. He obtained his first degree from the University of Bristol in 1975 and returned to Australia (where he had lived as a child) to read for a doctorate at the University of Adelaide, choosing as his theme the Cornish in Australia, completing this in 1978.

Naval career

In 1989 was appointed Senior Lecturer in the Department of History and International Affairs at the Royal Naval College, Greenwich.

Until his retirement from the service, he held the rank of commander in the Royal Naval Reserve and has seen active service when attached to the Army in Bosnia and Croatia in 1993 and more later aboard the aircraft carrier  in 2003 during the Iraq War. He finally retired from the Navy in 2008.

Academic career

In 1990 he gained a second doctorate, from the University of Plymouth, for a study of modern Cornwall from a centre-periphery perspective. He joined the University of Exeter as Director of the Institute of Cornish Studies, then situated at Pool, near Redruth, in 1991 but now at the Penryn Campus. He was promoted Reader in 1995 and Professor in 2000. He is a Fellow of both the Royal Historical Society and the Royal Society of Arts. In 2013 he was elected an Hon Fellow of the prestigious Australian Academy of the Humanities, shortly before stepping down as Director of the Institute of Cornish Studies. He is now Emeritus Professor of Cornish & Australian Studies at the University of Exeter, as well as Professor of History at Flinders University in Australia.

Amongst his many book and articles are Making Moonta: The Invention of Australia's Little Cornwall (2007), A.L. Rowse and Cornwall: A Paradoxical Patriot (2005), and the acclaimed Cornwall – A History, first published in 1996 and updated in 2004, which remains a major modern authoritative history of Cornwall. Other titles include The Cornish Miner in Australia (1984), The Making of Modern Cornwall (1992), and Cornwall Since the War (1993). He also edited the annual book series, Cornish Studies, published by University of Exeter Press, for twenty years, and was editor-in-chief of the Millennium Book for Cornwall Kernow Bys Vyken! – Cornwall Forever!, published by Cornwall Heritage Trust and distributed free to every schoolchild in Cornwall in 2000.

His other research interests in Modern Cornish history include Cornish emigration; ethnicity and territorial politics; and centre-periphery relations.

In 2010, he completed a book on John Betjeman and Cornwall: 'The Celebrated Cornish Nationalist (University of Exeter Press), and is editing (with Helen Doe and Alston Kennerley) a Maritime History of Cornwall. Among his other books are Regional Australia and the Great War: "The Boys from Old Kio" (University of Exeter Press, 2012), and a History of Sussex, published in 2017.

Bard of the Cornish Gorseth
Payton was made a Bard of Gorseth Kernow in 1981, taking the Bardic name Car Dyvresow ('Friend of Exiles').

In 2006 Payton's book A.L. Rowse and Cornwall : a paradoxical patriot won the Gorseth's Holyer an Gof trophy for best publication.

Personal life
He lives in Canberra with his partner, and has two adult daughters.

Select publications
 
  Paperback: 
  Paperback: .
 
 
 
 
  Rev. & updated ed., Fowey: Cornwall Editions, 2005, 
  Rev. ed. Cornwall : A history, Fowey: Cornwall Editions, 2004,  
 
 
 
 
 
 
 
  Paperback: 
 
 
 
  Paperback:

References

External links

University of Exeter, College of Humanities profile: Professor Philip Payton, Emeritus Professor

Living people
Education in Cornwall
Academics of the University of Exeter
Academics of the Royal Naval College, Greenwich
Alumni of the University of Bristol
Alumni of the University of Plymouth
Bards of Gorsedh Kernow
Cornish language
Cornish culture
English historians
Fellows of the Royal Historical Society
Royal Navy officers
University of Adelaide alumni
Historians of Cornwall
British maritime historians
1953 births
Royal Naval Reserve personnel